The South Florida Bulls women's soccer team represents the University of South Florida in the sport of soccer. The Bulls currently compete in the American Athletic Conference within Division I of the National Collegiate Athletic Association. The Bulls play in Corbett Stadium along with USF's men's soccer team, which opened in 2011. Prior to that, they played at what is now the USF Track and Field Stadium.

The Bulls have reached the NCAA Tournament seven times and have won seven combined regular season and tournament conference championships.

History

T. Logan Fleck era (1995–2006) 
USF's women's soccer team was founded in 1995, exactly 30 years after the men's soccer team began play as the first sports team in USF history. The first women's soccer coach in USF history was T. Logan Fleck, who also served as USF's men's soccer coach from 1994 to 1996. The program got off to a good start under Fleck and went 11–3 in its first season, including nine shutouts. The inaugural team contained no scholarship players and mainly played Division II opponents, but still defeated three Division I teams.

The team then entered a rough patch after joining the rest of USF's sports teams in Conference USA in 1996, finishing 6–11–1 overall and 2–7 against in conference opponents. The Bulls turned it around and won the regular season C-USA title in just their third season in the conference and fourth season of existence going 9–0–2 against conference foes and 15–1–3 overall, but lost to Marquette in the Conference USA Tournament Championship game. The Bulls would never again come near a Conference USA championship, falling as low as 1–8–1 in conference games in 2001 and leaving for the Big East in 2005. Fleck was fired following the Bulls 2006 campaign finishing 6–10–1.

Denise Schilte-Brown era (2006–present) 
Denise Schilte-Brown was hired to replace T. Logan Fleck as the Bulls head coach in December 2006. But USF continued to struggle in the Big East, finishing with a winning record against conference foes just three times. USF made the NCAA Tournament for the first time in 2010 after a 11–4–3 regular season and reaching the Big East Tournament Championship game where they fell to West Virginia 1–0. The Bulls won their first ever NCAA Tournament game by upsetting highly favored Auburn 3–1 in the first round then fell to No. 2 seed Florida State 2–1 in round two.

After the Big East Conference realignment in the early 2010s, USF became a member of the American Athletic Conference starting in the 2013 season. The Bulls quickly found success in their new conference behind goalkeeper Christiane Endler by making the semifinals of the 2013 conference tournament. In 2014, the Bulls made the AAC Tournament Championship game, which they lost on penalty kicks 3–2. The Bulls appeared in the NCAA Tournament for the second time in program history but fell in the first round. USF went to the AAC Tournament Championship game again in 2015, but lost the championship game on penalty kicks for the second year in a row. Also for the second straight year, the Bulls had a first round exit in the 2015 NCAA Tournament. In 2017, USF finished second in the conference during the regular season to arch rival Central Florida and the two would go on to meet in the AAC Tournament Championship game. There, the Bulls finally exorcised their championship game demons and won 5–3 on penalty kicks for their first ever conference tournament championship. This gave USF their first autobid to the NCAA Tournament in program history. The Bulls won their first-round game in the tournament 3–0 against FGCU but were eliminated with a 1–0 loss to No. 3 Florida in the second round.

USF followed their conference tournament championship with a regular season conference title and appearance in the 2018 AAC Tournament Championship, but lost to Memphis 3–0. They returned to the NCAA Tournament where they beat Albany 5–1 in the first round before losing 3–1 to eventual national champion Florida State. The Bulls and Memphis switched their conference results the next season, with USF coming in second to undefeated Memphis in the regular season then defeating the Tigers in the 2019 conference tournament. In the NCAA Tournament, USF upset Florida 4–2 in the first round, then shut out No. 4 Washington 2–0 to win a team record 16 games for the season and reach the Round of 16 for the first time, where they were defeated 2–1 by No. 1 seed Florida State, being eliminated by the Seminoles for the second year in a row. Senior Évelyne Viens was named to the second team all-American list.

In the 2020 season, which was delayed until the spring of 2021 because of the COVID-19 pandemic, the Bulls finished with their first undefeated regular season in program history with a 7–0–2 record, winning the regular season conference title for the second time in three seasons. Dubbed by local media and fans as "The InvinciBulls" (a play on the nickname given to Arsenal F.C. when they won the Premier League unbeaten in 2003–04), the 2020 Bulls had five members of the team named to the first team all-conference list. They won the conference tournament for the third time in four years and won it on home turf for the first time in program history to clinch a spot in their seventh NCAA Tournament. They were beaten in the second round by No. 7 Texas A&M.

In 2021, the Bulls won the regular season AAC crown again, making it five straight years of them winning either the regular season or tournament conference title. They lost to Memphis on penalty kicks in the conference tournament title game, but were still selected for the NCAA Tournament. They fell in the first round of the tournament to NC State.

Season-by-season results

Awards and recognition

Players

Olympians 
Four USF women's soccer players have competed in the Olympics. Évelyne Viens became the first USF alum in any sport to win an Olympic medal when Canada won gold in 2020.
  Olivia Chance – 2020
  Christiane Endler – 2020
  Demi Stokes – 2020
  Évelyne Viens – 2020

All Americans 

 Évelyne Viens (Third team, 2017)
 Évelyne Viens (Third team, 2018)
 Évelyne Viens (Second team, 2019)
Sydney Martinez (Second team, 2020)
Sydny Nasello (First team, 2020)

First team all-conference 

 Kristine Edner, 1996
 Kristine Edner, 1997
 Janeen Sobush, 1998
 Tia Opliger, 1998
 Kristine Edner, 1998
 Siri Nordby, 1999
 Siri Nordby, 2000
 Tia Opliger, 2002
 Katie Reed, 2003
 Breck Bankester, 2004
 Tia Opliger, 2004
 Lindsey Brauer, 2006
 Chelsea Klotz, 2010
 Taylor Patterson, 2012
 Jackie Simpson, 2013
 Sharla Passariello, 2013
 Demi Stokes, 2014
 Leticia Skeete, 2014
 Jackie Simpson, 2014
 Olivia Chance, 2015
 Grace Adams, 2016
 Kelli Burney, 2017
 Évelyne Viens, 2017
 Kat Elliot, 2017
 Kelli Burney, 2018
Évelyne Viens, 2018
 Évelyne Viens, 2019
 Andrea Hauksdottir, 2019
 Sydney Martinez, 2019
 Sydny Nasello, 2019
 Sydny Nasello, 2020
 Chyanne Dennis, 2020
 Vivianne Bessette, 2020
 Sydney Martinez, 2020
 Chiara Hahn, 2020
Sydny Nasello, 2021
 Chyanne Dennis, 2021
 Vivianne Bessette, 2021

Conference Player of the Year

Goalkeeper 

 Sydney Martinez, 2020

Defensive 

 Jackie Simpson, 2015
 Chyanne Dennis, 2020

Midfielder 

 Andrea Hauksdottir, 2018
 Andrea Hauksdottir, 2019

Offensive 

 Évelyne Viens, 2018
 Évelyne Viens, 2019
 Sydny Nasello, 2020
Sydny Nasello, 2021

Coaches

Conference Coach of the Year 

 T. Logan Fleck (1998)
 Denise Schlite-Brown (2018)
 Denise Schlite-Brown (2020)

Media 
Under the current American Athletic Conference TV deal, all home and in-conference away women's soccer games are shown on one of the various ESPN networks or streamed live on ESPN+. Live radio broadcasts of games are also available nationwide for free on the Bulls Unlimited digital radio station on TuneIn.

See also 

 South Florida Bulls men's soccer
 South Florida Bulls

References

External links 
 Women's Soccer Home

South Florida Bulls women's soccer
Soccer clubs in Florida
1995 establishments in Florida
Association football clubs established in 1995